The 1979 Marshall Thundering Herd football team was an American football team that represented Marshall University in the Southern Conference (SoCon) during the 1979 NCAA Division I-A football season. In its first season under head coach Sonny Randle, the team compiled a 1–10 record (0–6 against conference opponents) and was outscored by a total of 309 to 95. The team played its home games at Fairfield Stadium in Huntington, West Virginia.

Schedule

References

Marshall
Marshall Thundering Herd football seasons
Marshall Thundering Herd football